River ward is a political division returning three Councillors to the London Borough of Barking and Dagenham. Elected representation is by Inder Singh Jamu, Liam Smith, and Patricia Twomey, all of the Labour Party (UK).

References

External links
 Barking and Dagenham Labour Party
 Ward profile

Wards of the London Borough of Barking and Dagenham